"Love's Got a Hold on My Heart" is a song by British pop music group Steps. It was released as the lead single from the band's second album, Steptacular (1999). The song features Faye Tozer and Claire Richards on lead vocals. The single peaked at number two in the United Kingdom and became a top-20 hit in Finland, Flanders, Ireland, and New Zealand.

Critical reception
Can't Stop the Pop stated that "the one thing that immediately jumps out with this single – from that first keyboard whizz in the intro – is how summery it sounds. The track is not without a trademark hint of melodrama, but on the whole, it’s a much lighter production which exudes sunshine and warmth." They added that the chorus is "deceptively – and enduringly – catchy." Scottish newspaper Daily Record said it is "their best tune yet. A Europop sound, ABBA-tinged melody and they even supply the dance moves on the CD box". They also wrote, "This song sounds like the band looks - cheesy. The tune pops along using all the right ingredients to make sure you're tapping your feet."

Chart performance
The single missed out at number one on the UK Singles Chart, losing out to Latin pop singer Ricky Martin, who spent a second week at the top with "Livin' La Vida Loca". Spending 12 weeks on the British charts, this single is the group's only single to fall off the charts for two consecutive weeks and then re-enter. The song did reach number one on the Scottish Singles Chart, conversely preventing "Livin' la Vida Loca" from reaching the top spot. "Love's Got a Hold on My Heart" also peaked at number nine in Finland and Ireland, number 14 in the Flanders region of Belgium, number 18 in New Zealand, and number 29 in Australia.

Music video
The music video for the song, shot in Cannes in the South of France, was directed by Dani Jacobs. The main plot sees the group chase a man who has stolen the film reel for the fictitious "Steps: The Movie", interspersed with clips of the band performing the dance routine on a jetty dressed in yellow outfits.

Track listings

UK CD1
 "Love's Got a Hold on My Heart" – 3:19
 "Love's Got a Hold on My Heart" (W.I.P. Off the Wall mix) – 6:12
 "To Be Your Hero" – 3:49

UK CD2
 "Love's Got a Hold on My Heart" – 3:19
 "Love's Got a Hold on My Heart" (instrumental) – 3:20
 "Last Thing on My Mind" (Wip't Up in the Disco mix instrumental) – 5:41

UK cassette single
 "Love's Got a Hold on My Heart" – 3:19
 "To Be Your Hero" – 3:49

Australian and New Zealand CD single
 "Love's Got a Hold on My Heart" – 3:19
 "Love's Got a Hold on My Heart" (WIP Off the Wall mix) – 6:12
 "To Be Your Hero" – 3:49
 "Last Thing on My Mind" (WIP't UP the Disco mix instrumental) – 5:41
 "Love's Got a Hold on My Heart" (instrumental) – 3:20

Credits and personnel

A-side: "Love's Got a Hold on My Heart"
Credits adapted are from the liner notes of Steptacular.

Recording
 Recorded at PWL Studios, Manchester in 1999
 Mixed at PWL Studios, Manchester
 Mastered at Transfermation Studios, London

Vocals
 Lead vocals – Claire Richards, Faye Tozer
 Background vocals – Lisa Scott-Lee, Lee Latchford-Evans, Ian "H" Watkins

Personnel
 Songwriting – Andrew Frampton, Pete Waterman
 Production – Dan Frampton, Pete Waterman
 Mixing – Dan Frampton
 Engineer – Dan Frampton
 Drums – Pete Waterman
 Keyboards – Andrew Frampton
 Guitar – Dan Frampton
 Bass – Andrew Frampton

B-side: "To Be Your Hero"
Credits are adapted from the liner notes of "Love's Got a Hold on My Heart".

Recording
 Recorded at PWL Studios, Manchester in 1999
 Mixed at PWL Studios, Manchester
 Mastered at Transfermation Studios, London

Vocals
 Lead vocals – Ian "H" Watkins
 Background vocals – Claire Richards, Faye Tozer, Lisa Scott-Lee, Lee Latchford-Evans

Personnel
 Songwriting – Dan Frampton, Pete Waterman
 Production – Dan Frampton, Pete Waterman
 Mixing – Dan Frampton, Pete Waterman

Charts and certifications

Weekly charts

Year-end charts

Certifications

References

1999 singles
1999 songs
Jive Records singles
Number-one singles in Scotland
Pete Waterman Entertainment singles
Songs written by Andrew Frampton (songwriter)
Songs written by Pete Waterman
Steps (group) songs
UK Independent Singles Chart number-one singles